Wesley Memorial Church is a Methodist church in central Oxford, England. John and Charles Wesley studied in Oxford, and the congregation was founded in 1783. The present church building was completed in 1878. The building is now a focus for various social activities as well as Christian worship.

History
Oxford's first Methodist meeting house was a building on the east side of New Inn Hall Street. It is now numbered 32–34 and is part of Brasenose College. A plaque on the wall commemorates the fact that John Wesley preached there on 4 July 1783.

The congregation later moved to a second building on the west side of the street. This has since been sold and the site has been incorporated into St Peter's College.

The present Gothic Revival building was started in 1877 and opened in October 1878. The architect Charles Bell designed it in a revival of Decorated Gothic. The building contractor was Joshua Symm. Henry Frith of Gloucester carved the capitals of the columns, which portray twelve different kinds of English plants.

Gallery

References

Sources

External links
 Wesley Memorial Church, Oxford

1878 establishments in England
Churches completed in 1878
Methodist churches in Oxfordshire
English Gothic architecture in Oxfordshire
Wesley Memorial Church